Klyukino is a rural locality (a village) in Kichmegnskoye Rural Settlement, Kichmengsko-Gorodetsky District, Vologda Oblast, Russia. The population was 10 as of 2002.

Geography 
Klyukino is located 26 km east of Kichmengsky Gorodok (the district's administrative centre) by road. Gromozovo is the nearest rural locality.

References 

Rural localities in Kichmengsko-Gorodetsky District